ACS Berceni was a Romanian professional football club from Berceni, Romania, founded in 2008 and dissolved in 2016.

In their last season, they played in the Liga II, in the 2016–17 season.

History 
Founded in 1957, the team from Berceni didn't achieve much during its existence evolving only at the level of county football. 
However, in 2005–06 season, after businessman Marian Dodu taken over the club and renamed as Dodu Berceni, reached Liga III, winning Divizia D – Ilfov County and the promotion play-off against the champion of Divizia D – Dâmbovița County, Gaz Metan Finta (6–0 at Ploiești).
After two seasons in Liga III, in which it was ranked 5th in 2006–07 and 13th in 2007–08, the club was taken over by the authorities of Berceni Commune changing its name to ACS Berceni.
After a 10th place in the 2008–09 season, followed three seasons in which finished in the top of the standings, 2nd in (2009–10) 3rd in (2010–11 and 2011–12), predicting the promotion from 2012–13 season.
In the first three seasons in Liga II, Bercenarii ranked 5th in the 2013–14 season, 9th in the 2014–15 season and 8th in the 2015–16 season.

In the summer of 2016, the team was moved from their old stadium to Buftea after clashing with the local administration of Berceni. After 15 rounds, the team was in the last place with 0 points and withdrew from the championship, the second team that withdrew from the Liga II after Șoimii Pâncota.

Honours 
Liga III
Winners (1): 2012–13
Runners-up (1): 2009–10

Liga IV – Ilfov County
Winners (1): 2005–06

League history

References 

 BERCENI: Maşina de dat goluri a primelor trei ligi
 Marin Dragnea răspunde întrebărilor puse de cititorii Liga2.ro
 BERCENI: Statistica turului de campionat
 Sintetic de 100.000 euro la Berceni!
 Phoenix Ulmu 0- 2 ACS Berceni!

Defunct football clubs in Romania
Football clubs in Ilfov County
Association football clubs established in 2008
Association football clubs disestablished in 2016
2008 establishments in Romania
2016 disestablishments in Romania
Liga II clubs
Liga III clubs
Liga IV clubs